Pilotrulleum is a genus of beetles in the family Buprestidae, the jewel beetles. There are two species, both native to Mexico. P. caesariae can also be found in Costa Rica.

Species include:

 Pilotrulleum caesariae Bellamy & Westcott, 1995
 Pilotrulleum lagartiguanum Bellamy & Westcott, 1995

References

Buprestidae genera